Magnus Muhrén (born 4 November 1974) is a Swedish bandy coach and former player, who played as a forward.

Career

Club career
He started his career in Skutskärs IF and later played for Sandvikens AIK, Zorky Krasnogorsk, Dynamo Kazan, Dynamo Moscow, and GAIS.

International career
Muhrén was part of Swedish World Champions teams of 1997, 2003, 2005, and 2009

Managerial career
In 2017, Muhrén took over Sandvikens AIK.

Honours

Country 
 Sweden
 Bandy World Championship: 1997, 2003, 2005, 2009

References

External links

1974 births
Living people
Swedish bandy players
Swedish bandy managers
Sandvikens AIK players
Zorky Krasnogorsk players
Dynamo Kazan players
Dynamo Moscow players
GAIS Bandy players
Sandvikens AIK managers
Expatriate bandy players in Russia
Sweden international bandy players
Bandy World Championship-winning players